(SSPW) is a Japanese professional wrestling and martial arts promotion founded in 2005 by Satoru Sayama as  (RJPW), before being renamed in 2019. It runs shows every two or three months, and features both professional wrestling matches and matches from a variety of martial arts, like mixed martial arts, kickboxing, and Seikendo. It uses wrestlers from other promotions as well as its own talent, and has had working agreements with Toryumon Mexico, Battlarts, and Dradition.

Roster

 Akifumi Saito
 Great Tiger (Takatoriki Tadashige)
 Hayato Mashita
 Shodai Tiger Mask
 Super Rider
 Super Tiger (II)
 Tiger Shark
 Kozo Urita
 Kendo Nagasaki
 Masao Orihara

Notable guests

 Masakatsu Funaki
 Alexander Otsuka
 Atsushi Onita
 Daisuke Sekimoto
 Gran Hamada
 Hikaru Sato
 Mitsuya Nagai
 Riki Choshu
 Tatsumi Fujinami
 Último Dragón
 Great Sasuke
 Bear Fukuda
 Wakashoyo Shunichi
 Kota Ibushi
 Akebono
 Tatsuhito Takaiwa
 Minoru Suzuki

Championships

Active
, Strong Style Pro-Wrestling currently has two active championships.

Inactive

See also

Professional wrestling in Japan
List of professional wrestling promotions in Japan

References

External links
 

Japanese professional wrestling promotions
2005 establishments in Japan